The R105 road is a regional road in north Dublin, Ireland. It travels from the city centre to Howth, and loops at both ends; the road fully encircles Howth Head.  Along the way, the road passes through Fairview, the western end of Clontarf, Killester, Raheny, the coastal edge of Kilbarrack and Sutton.  Its biggest component is Howth Road.

The official description of the R105 from the Roads Act 1993 (Classification of Regional Roads) Order 2012  reads:

R105: Dublin - Howth, County Dublin

Between its junction with R138 at OConnell Street in the city of Dublin and its junction with R106 at Sutton Cross in the county of Fingal via Eden Quay, Beresford Place, Memorial Road (and via Talbot Memorial Bridge, Georges Quay and Burgh Quay), Amiens Street, North Strand Road, Annesley Bridge Road, Fairview and Howth Road in the city of Dublin: Dublin Road, Sutton; Sutton Cross, Howth Road; Harbour Road and Abbey Street at Howth; Thormanby Road, Carrickbrack Road and Greenfield Road in the county of Fingal.

See also
Roads in Ireland
National primary road
National secondary road
Regional road

References

Regional roads in the Republic of Ireland
Roads in County Dublin
Roads in Dublin (city)